Riverview Historic District may refer to:

in the United States
(by state)
 Riverview Historic District (Selma, Alabama), listed on the NRHP in Alabama
 Riverview Historic District (Valley, Alabama), listed on the NRHP in Alabama and Georgia
Old Riverview Historic District, Capitola, CA, listed on the NRHP in California
 Riverview Historic District (Kankakee, Illinois), listed on the NRHP in Illinois
 Riverview Historic District (Tulsa, Oklahoma), listed on the NRHP in Oklahoma
 Riverview Historic District (Miami, Florida), designated by the city of Miami.

See also
Riverview (disambiguation)
Riverview Apartments (disambiguation)
Riverview Park Plat Historic District, Des Moines, IA, listed on the NRHP in Iowa
Riverview Terrace Historic District, Davenport, IA, listed on the NRHP in Iowa